Jean-Jacques Juglas (10 June 1904 in Bergerac (Dordogne) – 17 August 1982 in Paris), was a French politician.

Positions 
 Minister of Overseas France in the Pierre Mendès France government (20 January 1955 to 23 February 1955)
 MRP deputy for the Seine (1945-1951)
 MRP deputy for Lot-et-Garonne (1951-1955)
 President of the Institut de recherche pour le développement (1960s)

References

1904 births
1982 deaths
People from Bergerac, Dordogne
Politicians from Nouvelle-Aquitaine
Popular Republican Movement politicians
French Ministers of Overseas France
Members of the Constituent Assembly of France (1945)
Members of the Constituent Assembly of France (1946)
Deputies of the 1st National Assembly of the French Fourth Republic
Deputies of the 2nd National Assembly of the French Fourth Republic
French people of the Algerian War